Ian Ward may refer to:

Ian Ward (cricketer) (born 1972), English cricketer
Ian Ward (physicist) (1928–2018), British physicist
Ian Ward (character), a character on the American soap opera The Young and the Restless
Mr Ward (1961–2008), named Ian Ward, Australian Aboriginal elder

See also
Iain Ward (born 1983), English footballer